Secaș may refer to the following places in Romania:

 Secaș, a commune in Timiș County
 Secaș, a village in the commune Brazii, Arad County
 Secaș (Sebeș), a right tributary of the river Sebeș in Sibiu and Alba Counties
 Secaș (Târnava), a left tributary of the river Târnava in Sibiu and Alba Counties